= Arise Academy =

Coordinates: 39°44′49″N 84°11′57″W

- 1 Elizabeth Pl. Dayton, Ohio 45408

Information
- Type: Charter
- School district: Arise Academy School District
- Grades: 9-12
- Website: http://www.ariseday.org/index.php

Arise Academy was a charter school in Dayton, Ohio. Established in 2004, it suffered chronic funding problems, closing in June 2010. Some school officials were subsequently convicted of bribery and given prison sentences. The school met two of the 12 state indicators for the 2005–2006 school year, earning it a rating of "Continuous Improvement".
